John Stanton Flemming CBE FBA (6 February 1941, Reading, Berkshire, England – 5 August 2003, Oxford, England) was an economist and Warden of Wadham College, Oxford.

John S. Flemming was educated at Rugby School, and then at Trinity College, Oxford, where in 1962 he attained a first class degree in Philosophy, Politics and Economics. He specialised in logic and economic theory, and was selected as a Student of Nuffield College, Oxford.

Flemming became a Lecturer and Fellow of Oriel College, Oxford (1963–65) and then Official Fellow in Economics at Nuffield College (1965–80). At Nuffield College he was Bursar from 1970–79 and Emeritus Fellow from 1980 until his death. He was also a Pro-Vice-Chancellor of Oxford University.

John Flemming was the editor of The Economic Journal from 1976–80, Chief Adviser at the Bank of England from 1980–84, Economic Adviser to the Governor of the Bank of England from 1984–88, and Executive Director from 1988–91. He was then Chief Economist of the newly created European Bank for Reconstruction and Development (EBRD) from 1991–93 and Warden of Wadham College, Oxford from 1993–2003. He was a member of the Board of Brunel University.

He was elected a Fellow of the British Academy in 1991 and received a CBE in 2001.

In 1963, Flemming married Jean Briggs. They had a daughter and three sons. He lived in Summertown and Park Town in North Oxford.

References

1941 births
2003 deaths
People from Reading, Berkshire
People educated at Rugby School
Alumni of Trinity College, Oxford
Fellows of Oriel College, Oxford
Fellows of Nuffield College, Oxford
20th-century British  economists
Academic journal editors
People associated with the Bank of England
Pro-Vice-Chancellors of the University of Oxford
Wardens of Wadham College, Oxford
People associated with Brunel University London
Fellows of the British Academy
Commanders of the Order of the British Empire
Alumni of Nuffield College, Oxford
20th-century English businesspeople